Synopeas is a genus of parasitoid wasps in the family Platygastridae. There are about 400 described species in Synopeas.

See also
 List of Synopeas species

References

Further reading

 

Parasitic wasps
Platygastridae

Taxa named by Arnold Förster